Frank Aloysious Herda (born September 13, 1947) is a former United States Army soldier and a recipient of the United States military's highest decoration, the Medal of Honor, for his actions in the Vietnam War.

Military career
Herda joined the United States Army from his birth city of Cleveland, Ohio, and by June 29, 1968, was serving as a private first class in Company A, 1st Battalion (Airborne), 506th Infantry Regiment, 101st Airborne Division (Airmobile). During an enemy attack on that day, near Dak To in Quang Trang Province, Republic of Vietnam, Herda smothered the blast of an enemy-thrown hand grenade with his body to protect those around him. He survived the blast, although severely wounded, and was subsequently promoted to specialist four and awarded the Medal of Honor for his actions.

Herda published the sword and sorcery novel, The Cup of Death: Chronicles of the Dragons of the Magi, in 2007.

Medal of Honor citation
Specialist Herda's official Medal of Honor citation reads:

See also

List of Medal of Honor recipients for the Vietnam War

References

External links

1947 births
Living people
United States Army personnel of the Vietnam War
United States Army Medal of Honor recipients
Military personnel from Cleveland
United States Army soldiers
Vietnam War recipients of the Medal of Honor